Savile William Francis Crossley, 3rd Baron Somerleyton,  (17 September 1928 – 24 January 2012) was a British courtier.

He served as Lord-in-waiting from 1979 to 1992 and Master of the Horse to the Queen between 1991 and 1998.

References

External links

 Tributes to Lord Somerleyton

1928 births
2012 deaths
Baronesses- and Lords-in-Waiting
Barons in the Peerage of the United Kingdom
Knights Grand Cross of the Royal Victorian Order
Somerleyton